Talkman (PSP-240) is a program developed by Sony Computer Entertainment for the Sony PlayStation Portable video game console. It is a voice-activated translation software application that operates in four languages Japanese, English, Korean, and Chinese (Mandarin).
The name "Talkman" is a reference to Sony's Walkman line of portable audio products. It was released in Japan on November 17, 2005 and in America on August 5, 2008 (via the PlayStation Store) as Talkman Travel. In America, however, instead of receiving all the languages included in the Japanese version in one package, you have the option to buy a single pack for $2.99 a piece. Available packs are: Paris (French), Rome (Italian), and Tokyo (Japanese).

The software is designed for travelers and entertainment, mostly containing slang and useful travel phrases. While originally sold in and designed for the Japanese market for Japanese users, its translation function operates between all four languages . In Japan, the software has proven popular with the middle-aged female demographic due to an interest in South Korean products, and Korean-language soap operas and movies; and as a fun English education aid for children .

This product has also been officially released in Hong Kong with a Traditional Chinese packaging and manual. However, it does not seem that Sony is manufacturing any more of these for the Hong Kong market and most retailers that are sold out claims that it will no longer be restocked.

Outside of pure translations, Talkman also lets players play games to test their fluency of a language. The program comes with a USB microphone included.  This microphone draws power through two gold-colored contacts on the top of the PSP, one on each side of the mini-USB port.  This is uncommon due to the ability for most USB products to draw power through USB.  These proprietary contacts are similar to the gold-colored contacts on the bottom-right of the device, which are used for charging.

Note:  The Chotto Shot (aka "Go!Cam") has a built-in microphone that also can be used with the Talkman program.

Talkman Euro
Following the success of the Asian version of Talkman, a version designed for translating European languages was developed and released on June 16, 2006. Talkman Euro is available in two versions. The Japanese version contains support for English, Italian, Spanish, German, French, and Japanese, while the Chinese version contains support for Traditional Chinese instead of Japanese. The differences on the packaging (the Japanese flag as opposed to a flag with the word "mie" in Chinese) are minimal and hard to notice.

Talkman UMD-only package
Talkman is also released as a UMD-only package, so users who already have the USB mic or camera can choose to purchase this standalone version. The Sony PSP Headset has also been confirmed to work with Talkman.

References

External links
Talkman GameSpot review of European version
Pocket Gamer review of European version
Talkman Official site

PlayStation Portable games
Machine translation